Roger Brown McDonald (2 February 1933 – 22 October 1996) was a Scottish professional footballer who played in the Football League for Mansfield Town.

References

1933 births
1996 deaths
Scottish footballers
Association football defenders
English Football League players
St Mirren F.C. players
Cheltenham Town F.C. players
Mansfield Town F.C. players
Crystal Palace F.C. players